Shorea roxburghii is a species of tree in the family Dipterocarpaceae. It is native to Cambodia, India, Laos, Malaysia, Burma, Thailand, and Vietnam.

Common names
Malay: temak, a name it sometimes shares with Shorea hypochra
, transliterated phayom 
Vietnamese: sến đỏ

References in place names
Ban Dongphayom (บ้านดงพยอม) in Thailand, literally Shorea roxburghii Forest Village

References

roxburghii
Trees of Indo-China
Trees of Peninsular Malaysia
Taxonomy articles created by Polbot